São José da Coroa Grande (English: Saint Joseph of Crown Big) is a city in Pernambuco with 21,586 inhabitants. It is southernmost city of the state on the coast section.

Geography

 State - Pernambuco
 Region - Zona da mata Pernambucana
 Boundaries - Barreiros  (N and W);  Alagoas state  (S);  Atlantic Ocean   (E)
 Area - 69.2 km2
 Elevation - 2 m
 Vegetation - Forest Subperenifólia and Coconut trees
 Clima - Hot tropical and humid
 Annual average temperature - 25.3 c
 Distance to Recife - 121 km

Beaches

 Gravatá beach
Used for underwater fishing. Although still primitive, has vast area of coconut trees, mangrove vegetation and weak waves.

Barra da Cruz beach
As Gravatá beach and Várzea do Una, is suitable for hunting underwater.

Várzea do Una beach
Bay with strong waves, large strip of sand. Also is suitable for fishing underwater and is located in the estuary of Una River.

Coroa Grande beach
Which means great crown, is located in the urban coast of the city. Has weak waves and sand banks up to the natural reefs, about 600 yards from the beach.

Economy

The main economic activities in São José da Coroa Grande are based in tourism, artisanal fishing and agriculture, especially sugarcane and coconuts.

Economic Indicators

Economy by Sector
2006

Health Indicators

References

Populated coastal places in Pernambuco
Municipalities in Pernambuco